The 2018 Magyar Kupa (known as the BENU Férfi Magyar Kupa for sponsorship reasons), was the 92nd edition of the tournament.

Participating clubs
The following 17 teams qualified for the competition:

Schedule
The rounds of the 2018 competition are scheduled as follows:

Preliminary round
The preliminary round ties were scheduled for 26–28 October 2018.

Group A
Tournament was played at Abay Nemes Oszkár Sportuszoda, Pécs.

Group B
Tournament was played at Tiszaligeti uszoda (Vizilabda Aréna), Szolnok.

Group C
Tournament was played at Bitskey Aladár uszoda, Eger.

Group D
Tournament was played at Szegedi Sportuszoda, Szeged.

Quarter-finals
The quarter-final matches were played on 17 and 18 November 2018.

|}

Final four
The final four was held on 15 and 16 December 2018 at the Császár-Komjádi Swimming Stadium in Budapest, II. ker.

Semi-finals

Final

Final standings

See also
2018–19 Országos Bajnokság I (National Championship of Hungary)
2018 Szuperkupa (Super Cup of Hungary)

References

External links
 Hungarian Water Polo Federaration

Seasons in Hungarian water polo competitions
Hungary
Magyar Kupa Men